Ossian Ray (December 13, 1835 – January 28, 1892) was a United States representative from New Hampshire.

Early years
Ray was born in Hinesburg, Vermont and his family moved to Irasburg, Vermont when he was young. He attended the public schools and an academy in nearby Derby. He studied law in Irasburg and in Lancaster, New Hampshire, where he moved in 1854. Mr. Ray was admitted to the bar in 1857 and practiced in Essex and Coos counties.

Politics
Ray was the solicitor for Coos County, New Hampshire from 1862 to 1872. He twice served as a member of the New Hampshire House of Representatives in 1868 and, again, in 1869. He was a delegate to the Republican National Convention in 1872. For a short time, from February 22, 1879, until he resigned effective on December 23, 1880, Ray was the United States Attorney for the District of New Hampshire. He was elected as a Republican to the Forty-sixth Congress to fill the vacancy caused by the death of Evarts W. Farr and was re-elected to the Forty-seventh and Forty-eighth Congresses, serving from January 8, 1881, to March 3, 1885. Ray did not seek renomination in 1884.

Death
Ossian Ray died in Lancaster, New Hampshire in 1892 and was buried in the Summer Street Cemetery.

References

External links
 

1835 births
1892 deaths
People from Hinesburg, Vermont
New Hampshire lawyers
People from Orleans County, Vermont
Republican Party members of the New Hampshire House of Representatives
United States Attorneys for the District of New Hampshire
Republican Party members of the United States House of Representatives from New Hampshire
19th-century American politicians
19th-century American lawyers